Ernest Wood (died July 13, 1942) was an American stage and screen actor. He played in many movies, including Woman's Law, A Perfect Gentleman, Not Damaged, Call It Luck, and False Pretenses.

References

External links
Ernest Wood on IMDb

1942 deaths
American male stage actors
Male actors from Los Angeles
20th-century American male actors